The US Post Office—Newburyport Main is a historic post office in Newburyport, Massachusetts.  Construction of the Georgian Revival single story brick building was begun in 1927 and completed in 1928.  It was Newburyport's first purpose-built post office facility.  The building is faced in red brick laid in running bond.  Its central section, which houses the lobby area, projects slightly from wings on either side, and features three round arches trimmed in marble.  The wings house offices, and the rear of the building houses the service area.  The front block has a pitched hip roof, while the rear portion has a flat roof.

The building was designed by architects in the Office of the Supervising Architect, then under the direction of acting supervising architect James A. Wetmore. The contractor was A. M. Lundberg of St. Louis, Missouri.

The building was listed on the National Register of Historic Places in 1986; it was also included in the Newburyport Historic District in 1984.

See also 
National Register of Historic Places listings in Essex County, Massachusetts
List of United States post offices

References 

Newburyport
Buildings and structures in Newburyport, Massachusetts
National Register of Historic Places in Essex County, Massachusetts
Individually listed contributing properties to historic districts on the National Register in Massachusetts